Arthur Edvard af Forselles (11 February 1864, Lammi – 27 July 1953, Kannus) was a Finnish physician and politician. He was a member of the Diet of Finland in 1897, 1899 and from 1905 to 1906 and of the Parliament of Finland from 1919 to 1922, representing the Swedish People's Party of Finland (SFP). His sister was the sculptor Sigrid af Forselles.

References

1864 births
1953 deaths
People from Hämeenlinna
People from Häme Province (Grand Duchy of Finland)
Swedish People's Party of Finland politicians
Members of the Diet of Finland
Members of the Parliament of Finland (1919–22)
19th-century Finnish physicians
University of Helsinki alumni
Academic staff of the University of Helsinki